Niaprazine (INN) (brand name Nopron) is a sedative-hypnotic drug of the phenylpiperazine group. It has been used in the treatment of sleep disturbances since the early 1970s in several European countries including France, Italy, and Luxembourg. It is commonly used with children and adolescents on account of its favorable safety and tolerability profile and lack of abuse potential.

Originally believed to act as an antihistamine and anticholinergic, niaprazine was later discovered to have low or no binding affinity for the H1 and mACh receptors (Ki = > 1 μM), and was instead found to act as a potent and selective 5-HT2A and α1-adrenergic receptor antagonist (Ki = 75 nM and 86 nM, respectively). It possesses low or no affinity for the 5-HT1A, 5-HT2B, D2, and β-adrenergic, as well as at SERT and VMAT (Ki = all > 1 μM), but it does have some affinity for the α2-adrenergic receptor (Ki = 730 nM).

Niaprazine has been shown to metabolize to the compound para-fluorophenylpiperazine (pFPP) in a similar manner to how trazodone and nefazodone metabolize to meta-chlorophenylpiperazine (mCPP). It is unclear what role, if any, pFPP plays in the clinical effects of niaprazine. However, from animal studies it is known that pFPP, unlike niaprazine, does not produce sedative effects, and instead exerts a behavioral profile indicative of serotonergic activation.

References

Alpha-1 blockers
Alpha-2 blockers
Fluoroarenes
Hypnotics
Nicotinamides
Phenylpiperazines
Sedatives